Herbert Obele (born 11 November 1980) is a German football player. He made his debut on the professional league level in the 2. Bundesliga for 1. FC Nürnberg on 26 January 2004, when he came on as a substitute in the 80th minute in a game against Alemannia Aachen.

References

1980 births
People from Neuburg an der Donau
Sportspeople from Upper Bavaria
Living people
German footballers
FC Augsburg players
1. FC Nürnberg players
SSV Jahn Regensburg players
FC Ingolstadt 04 players
2. Bundesliga players
Association football midfielders
FC Ingolstadt 04 II players
Footballers from Bavaria